Cameroon competed at the 1992 Summer Olympics in Barcelona, Spain.

Competitors
The following is the list of number of competitors in the Games.

Results by event

Athletics
Men's Marathon
 Paul Kuété — 2:22.43 (→ 46th place)

 Samuel Nchinda-Kaya
 Monique Kengné 
 Léonie Mani 
 Georgette N'Koma 
 Susie Tanéfo
 Louisette Thobi

Weightlifting
Alphonse Hercule Matam

References

Sources
Official Olympic Reports
sports-reference

Nations at the 1992 Summer Olympics
1992
1992 in Cameroonian sport